The collection of gold dental fillings, dental caps and dentures extracted from the mouths of the victims of Aktion T4 and the Nazi concentration camps was a feature of the Holocaust. The practice originated with a 1940 order from Heinrich Himmler, and reinforced by a second order in 1942. The collection was done with the active and voluntary cooperation of German dentists. Dentists involved in the collection of gold included Martin Hellinger.

Collected gold was then melted down into gold bars. The disposition of the gold was an issue following the end of the war.

Trials and prosecution 
With studies of the complicity of the medical profession in the crimes of the Third Reich on the rise, there is a question raised of the extent of justice brought down upon the doctors during the international trials after World War II. The trials led to 48 dentists standing trial. The archetypical accused dentist was male, lived in a traditional family, was a part of the National Socialist Workers' Party (NSDAP) and the Waffen-SS (Schutzstaffel), and belonged to the Kriegsjugendgeneration.

Results of trials 
47 male dentists and one female dentist were identified in one of the studies. 27 of the accused dentists were born from 1900–1910, meaning that they belonged to the Kriegsjugendgeneration. Fifteen were born before 1900 and six were born after 1910. Kriegsjugendgeneration members were influenced by National Socialism at a young age and this generation was the most important generation for the National Socialists for recruitment.

Many of these dentists served in concentration camps and their administrative offices. Of the 48 identified dentists, 22 were station in at least one concentration camp. Of these 22, 19 were members of the Waffen-SS.

See also 
 Nazi gold

References 

The Holocaust
Robberies
Medical crime
Nazi war crimes